Advanced Energy Materials is a peer reviewed scientific journal covering energy-related research, including photovoltaics, batteries, supercapacitors, fuel cells, hydrogen technologies, thermoelectrics, photocatalysis, solar power technologies, magnetic refrigeration, and piezoelectric materials. It publishes invited reviews and progress reports, full papers, and rapid communications. Established in 2011, Adv. Energy Mater. began as a monthly journal in 2012 and switched to 18/year in 2014, biweekly in 2016, 36/year in 2018, and weekly in 2019.

Abstracting and indexing 
The journal is abstracted and indexed in:
 Chemistry Citation Index 
 Current Contents/Engineering, Computing & Technology 
 Current Contents/Physical, Chemical & Earth Sciences 
 ENERGY
 Inspec
 Materials Science Citation Index
 Science Citation Index Expanded

References

External links
 

Energy and fuel journals
English-language journals
Materials science journals
Publications established in 2011
Monthly journals
Wiley-Blackwell academic journals
Energy research